Kornel Saláta (born 24 January 1985) is a Slovak professional football who plays as a centre-back for II. liga club KFC Komárno.

Club career
Saláta made his Corgoň Liga debut in the 2005–06 season for Matador Púchov. After season Púchov relegated to the Slovak First League and Saláta signed for Artmedia Petržalka. There he won the Corgoň Liga and the Slovak Cup in the 2007–08 season. In summer 2009, he  
moved to Slovan Bratislava, playing first match in the 2009 Slovak Super Cup. In January 2011, he signed four-year contract for Russian club Rostov for €1 million as one of the best Corgoň Liga defenders.

Saláta left Rostov in August 2014.

International career
Saláta made his national team debut against Switzerland on 24 May 2008. He participated at the 2010 FIFA World Cup, playing 83 minutes in second group match against Paraguay.

Personal life
Saláta hails from the Hungarian minority in Slovakia. He speaks both Slovak and Hungarian fluently, also with knowledge of Russian and English.

Career statistics
Scores and results list Slovakia's goal tally first, score column indicates score after each Saláta goal.

Honours
Artmedia
 Corgoň Liga: 2007–08
 Slovak Cup: 2007–08

Slovan
 Slovak Cup: 2009–10
 Slovak Super Cup: 2009

References

External links
  
 
 

1985 births
Living people
People from Nové Zámky District
Sportspeople from the Nitra Region
Hungarians in Slovakia
Slovak footballers
Association football central defenders
Slovakia international footballers
2010 FIFA World Cup players
UEFA Euro 2016 players
Slovak Super Liga players
Russian Premier League players
Nemzeti Bajnokság I players
MŠK Púchov players
FC Petržalka players
FK Dukla Banská Bystrica players
ŠK Slovan Bratislava players
FC Rostov players
FC Tom Tomsk players
FC DAC 1904 Dunajská Streda players
Szombathelyi Haladás footballers
KFC Komárno players
Slovak expatriate footballers
Slovak expatriate sportspeople in Russia
Expatriate footballers in Russia
Slovak expatriate sportspeople in Hungary
Expatriate footballers in Hungary